The Flowers Galleries are two galleries in London (on Cork Street in the West End, and in Shoreditch in the East End) and a third in the Chelsea district of New York City. The three galleries represent over 60 artists.

History  
The first Flowers Gallery was established by Angela Flowers in February 1968 on Lisle Street in London's West End. Later in the 1980s, a new space known as Flowers East opened in the East End. Co-founder and philologist Matthew Flowers, Angela's third son, took over day-to-day running of the business in November 1989. By late 1998, the gallery expanded further with a Los Angeles space, at Bergamot Station known as Flowers West. The formal West End quarters on Cork Street was until Spring 2010 known as Flowers Central. In 2002 Flowers East moved from Hackney into a 12,000 sq foot industrial space in Shoreditch.

In 2003 the U.S. gallery relocated from Los Angeles to Madison Avenue in New York City, and in 2009 moved to its then location on West 20th Avenue in Chelsea. Similarly to the two galleries in London, Flowers West is no longer in use.

References

External links 

Contemporary art galleries in London
Photography museums and galleries in England
Art museums and galleries in Manhattan
Photography museums and galleries in the United States